Nadia P. Manzoor is a British-Pakistani writer, performer, and producer based in Brooklyn, New York. She is best known for her autobiographical solo show Burq Off! and for her web series Shugs & Fats.

Early life 
Raised in Hertfordshire, England, she attended St. Albans High School for Girls and Manchester University. She received a Masters in Social Work from Boston University where she began developing an interest in art as activism.

Career 
Manzoor moved to New York City in 2011 and began taking improvisation classes with Groundlings based improv school Improvolution and teaching performing arts curriculum to marginalized teens with the Hetrick-Martin Institute.

Burq Off! 

In December 2013, Manzoor's autobiographical solo show Burq Off! premiered in New York City. Manzoor is the writer and performer of the show, which sold out its first run and went on tour to sold out audiences in LA, San Francisco, London, Toronto, Vancouver, and Seoul. Burq Off! is a one woman comedy about growing up in a conservative Muslim home in London, and explores themes of sex, religion, culture, truth and family. In it, Manzoor portrays over twenty-one characters. She has spoken about the show in interviews with Christiane Amanpour, Deepak Chopra, and Jane Garvey among others.

Shugs & Fats 

Manzoor is the creator of comedy web-series Shugs & Fats with comedian Radhika Vaz. Shugs & Fats is a buddy comedy about two hijabis exploring their freedom as recent immigrants to Brooklyn. Manzoor and Vaz were named among the 25 New Faces in Independent Film in 2016 by Filmmaker Magazine. Shugs & Fats has had screenings at Tribeca Film Festival, Miami Film Festival, and Tacoma Film Festival.

The series won a Gotham Award in 2015 and is currently in development with Jill Soloway and Amazon Studios.

Personal life 
She is married to actor Conrad Caton whom she met in an acting class.

References

Living people
Year of birth missing (living people)
Place of birth missing (living people)
People from Hertfordshire
British expatriates in the United States
Alumni of the University of Manchester
Boston University School of Social Work alumni
English stand-up comedians
American stand-up comedians
British people of Pakistani descent
Comedians from New York City